The BioSteel All-Canadian Basketball Game is an annual Canadian all-star game featuring high school basketball players. It was founded in 2015 by BioSteel Sports Nutrition Inc. and Canada Basketball. Originally a boys basketball game, the event was expanded to include a girls game in 2019. The games features the top 24 male and female high school basketball players either born in Canada or playing in the country. The Canadian game has drawn comparisons to America's McDonald's All-American Game. The first boys game was attended by upwards of 60 executives and scouts from the National Basketball Association (NBA). The game is broadcast by The Sports Network (TSN), who showed the inaugural event on tape delay before presenting it live the following year.

The games are held annually at the Goldring Centre for High Performance Sport on the campus of the University of Toronto.

Game MVPs
Following are the most valuable players (MVP) from each year:

References

External links

Basketball all-star games
Basketball competitions in Canada
High school basketball in Canada
Recurring sporting events established in 2015